José Alejandro Dionisio Luna Ledesma (1 December 1939 – 13 December 2022) was a Mexican scenic designer and lighting technician.

Life and career 
Luna was born in Mexico City, where he passed his studies of architecture. He has worked in theater, opera and for TV and cinema productions. He also was director of the Centro Universitario de Teatro of the Universidad Nacional Autónoma de México (UNAM) and taught at several Mexican universities from 1968 to 2007. He participated at the Prague Quadriennale from 1967 to 1975 three times in a row, as well as in 2003 and 2007. In 2003 he was a member of the Prague Quadriennale. He was the father of actor Diego Luna.

Luna died on 13 December 2022, at the age of 83.

Awards 
 Premio Nacional de las Artes, 2001
 Distinguished Artist Award of the International Society of Performing Arts, 2004
 Doctor Honoris Causa of the Universidad Autónoma de Baja California (UABC)

References

External links 
 
 

1939 births
2022 deaths
People from Mexico City
Mexican architects
Mexican scenic designers
Academic staff of the National Autonomous University of Mexico
National Prize for Arts and Sciences (Mexico)